Lycomorphodes bicolor is a moth of the family Erebidae. It was described by Rothschild in 1913. It is found in Colombia.

References

 Natural History Museum Lepidoptera generic names catalog

Cisthenina
Moths described in 1913